The 13th Television State Awards festival (Sinhala: 13 වැනි රූපවාහිනී රාජ්‍ය සම්මාන උලෙළ), was held to honor the television programs of 2015 Sinhala television on November 21, 2016, at the Nelum Pokuna Mahinda Rajapaksa Theatre, Colombo 07, Sri Lanka. The event was organized by the State Television Advisory Council, Arts Council of Sri Lanka, Department of Cultural Affairs, Ministry of Housing and Cultural Affairs. Somaweera Senanayake and Iranganie Serasinghe were attended as the Chief Guests.

At the award ceremony, 76 artists who excelled in forty different disciplines in the field of teledrama were awarded. Prominent dramatist Lucien Bulathsinhala received the Lifetime Achievement Award. Meanwhile, Somasiri Ilangasinghe, Giwantha Arthasad, G.N. Gunawardena, T. Sri Skandha Raja and Dharmadasa Paranagamayana were honored for their contribution to the advancement of the art of tele-drama.

Awards

Media Section

Television Serial Section

See also
 7th Sri Lankan Television State Awards

References

Sri Lankan Television State Awards
Sri Lankan Television State Awards